Chang Hai  (MIT, ช้างไห้) was the thirteenth album by Thai rock band Carabao. It was released in 1993. Its popular songs include "Yai Sam-aang" and "Raeng Khoi".

Track listing

Single for albums
 Chang Hai
 Yai Sam-ang
 Raaeg Khoi
 Salawin
 Yang Mai Sai

References

1993 albums
Carabao (band) albums